Stephen Deon Draie Goldsborough better known by his stage name Young Steff, is an American singer, rapper, and songwriter. Steff was born in Vineland, New Jersey. His father was a member of the gospel group Spirit, and his aunt, Gina Thompson has worked with producer Rodney Jerkins. Steff signed to Roc-A-Fella Records in 2000 and scored a hit with the song "Can I Holla" that featured Bow Wow.

Albums
2005: Here and Now (shelved)

Singles
2004: "R.O.C. Anthem"
2008: "Put That on Everything"
2008: "Professional" (#113 US R&B)
2009: "Slow Jukin'" (#85 US R&B)

References

External links

Official website
Young Steff | Listen and Stream Free Music, Albums, New Releases, Photos, Videos Official Myspace

1988 births
Living people
People from Vineland, New Jersey
20th-century African-American people
African-American rappers
Atlantic Records artists
Roc-A-Fella Records artists
21st-century African-American people